Derbyshire County Cricket Club in 1892 was the cricket season when the English club Derbyshire had been playing for twenty one years. Derbyshire's matches were not considered to be first class in this season. The club had lost first class status after 1887 and did not regain it until 1894, the year before they joined the County Championship. However many of the players competed for the club earlier or subsequently at first-class level.

1892 season

Derbyshire played thirteen games, and all except for Cheshire were against sides that they had played in first class matches before 1888 or that joined the County Championship four years later. Sydney Evershed was in his second year as captain. Harry Bagshaw was top scorer. George Davidson scored a century and  topped the bowling with 91 wickets. Derbyshire played an interesting turn-around match against Leicestershire. Derbyshire had to follow on at 100 behind and made 423 in the second innings with centuries by Evershed and Davidson. Leicestershire were all out for 98 with Hulme taking five wickets for three runs.

Chatterton played one Test match for England against South Africa earlier in the year. He also played several first class matches during the season, mainly for MCC or Players v Gentlemen. Davidson also played first class matches for MCC.

Matches

Statistics

Batting averages

Bowling averages

Wicket Keeper

W Storer Catches 13, Stumping 6

See also
Derbyshire County Cricket Club seasons
1892 English cricket season

References

1892 in English cricket
Derbyshire County Cricket Club seasons
English cricket seasons in the 19th century